Olbus is a genus of South American corinnid sac spiders first described by Eugène Simon in 1880 as a huntsman spider. It was moved to the sac spider family in 1988, then to the Corinnidae in 2001.

Species
 it contains five species, all found in Chile:
Olbus eryngiophilus Ramírez, Lopardo & Bonaldo, 2001 – Chile
Olbus jaguar Ramírez, Lopardo & Bonaldo, 2001 – Chile
Olbus krypto Ramírez, Lopardo & Bonaldo, 2001 – Chile
Olbus nahuelbuta Ramírez, Lopardo & Bonaldo, 2001 – Chile
Olbus sparassoides (Nicolet, 1849) (type) – Chile

References

Araneomorphae genera
Corinnidae
Spiders of South America
Taxa named by Eugène Simon
Endemic fauna of Chile